Manuel Fleitas Solich (30 December 1900 – 24 March 1984) was a Paraguayan football player and coach. He was known as "El Brujo" (the Wizard).

Career as a player
Fleitas Solich played for Club Nacional of Paraguay where he won two Paraguayan League titles, in 1924 and 1926. He also played for Boca Juniors where as the captain of the team he led them to the 1930 Argentine title. During his time at Boca he played 99 games for the club in all competitions, scoring 15 goals. He suffered an injury in 1930 and never recovered to his full ability.

In Argentina he also played for clubs such as Racing Club, Platense and Talleres (RE).

While playing for the Paraguay national football team, Solich had 32 caps and 6 goals.

Career as a coach
Solich's career as a coach proved to be impressive as he led the Paraguay national team to a final in the 1947 Copa América and won the 1953 tournament (which was the first Copa América ever won by Paraguay). He also coached the Paraguay national team at the 1950 FIFA World Cup. At the club level coached several Brazilian clubs such as Palmeiras, Corinthians, Atlético, Fluminense and Flamengo, being this last club where he won several titles. In Europe, Solich coached Real Madrid for seven months of the 1959–1960 season, where he led the Spanish team to 21 wins, 5 draws and 4 losses. He also coached the Peru national football team, Newell's Old Boys, Quilmes, Club Libertad and his beloved Club Nacional.

References

External links
 Short Info at Club Nacional's website
 Real Madrid coaches

1900 births
1984 deaths
Sportspeople from Asunción
Paraguayan footballers
Paraguay international footballers
Paraguayan expatriate footballers
Expatriate footballers in Argentina
Paraguayan football managers
1950 FIFA World Cup managers
Expatriate football managers in Argentina
Expatriate football managers in Brazil
Expatriate football managers in Spain
Club Nacional footballers
Boca Juniors footballers
Racing Club de Avellaneda managers
Club Atlético Platense managers
Talleres de Remedios de Escalada footballers
Paraguay national football team managers
Club Atlético Lanús managers
Newell's Old Boys managers
Quilmes Atlético Club managers
Talleres de Remedios de Escalada managers
Club Olimpia managers
Club Libertad managers
CR Flamengo managers
Real Madrid CF managers
Sport Club Corinthians Paulista managers
Fluminense FC managers
Sociedade Esportiva Palmeiras managers
Clube Atlético Mineiro managers
Esporte Clube Bahia managers
Club Nacional managers
Paraguayan expatriate sportspeople in Argentina
Paraguayan expatriate sportspeople in Brazil
Paraguayan expatriate sportspeople in Spain
Association football midfielders